Anthony Cook or Cooke may refer to:

Anthony Cook (born 1949), an American serial killer
 Anthony Cook (American football) (born 1972), former American football defensive end
 Anthony Cook (basketball) (born 1967), retired American basketball player
 Anthony Cook (footballer) (born 1989), English footballer, currently playing for Ebbsfleet United
 Anthony Cooke (1504–1576), tutor to the young Edward VI of England
 Anthony Cooke (MP for Lymington) (1559–1604), Member of Parliament (MP) for Lymington
 Anthony Cooke (Royal Navy officer) (1927–2019), British admiral
 Anthony John Cooke (1931–2012), organist and composer

See also 
 Anthony Coke, 6th Earl of Leicester (1909–1994), pronounced Anthony Cook
 Tony Cook (disambiguation)